The Constitution Alteration (Local Government Bodies) Bill 1974, was an unsuccessful proposal to alter the Australian Constitution to allow the Commonwealth to grant financial assistance to local government bodies, and to borrow money on their behalf. It was put to voters for approval in a referendum held on 18 May 1974.

Question
Proposed law entitled "An Act to alter the Constitution to enable the Commonwealth to borrow money for, and to grant financial assistance to, local government bodies".

Do you approve the proposed law?

The proposal was to insert into section 51 that the Parliament have power to make laws with respect to:
(ivA.) The borrowing of money by the Commonwealth for local government bodies

And to add a new section 96A
96A. The Parliament may grant financial assistance to any local government body on such terms and conditions as the Parliament thinks fit.

Results

See also
Politics of Australia
History of Australia

References

Referendum (Local Government Bodies)
1974 referendums
Constitutional referendums in Australia
History of local government in Australia